Brighamia insignis, commonly known as ʻŌlulu or Alula in Hawaiian, or colloquially as the vulcan palm or cabbage on a stick, is a endangered species of Hawaiian lobelioid in the bellflower family, Campanulaceae. It is native to the islands of Kauai and Niihau. This short-lived perennial species is a member of a unique endemic Hawaiian genus with only one other species.

Description 
Brighamia insignis is a potentially branched plant with a succulent stem that is bulbous at the bottom and tapers toward the top, ending in a compact rosette of fleshy leaves. The stem is usually  in height, but can reach . The plant blooms in September through November. It has clusters of fragrant yellow flowers in groups of three to eight in the leaf axils. The scent has been compared to honeysuckle.

Distribution and habitat 
It is extremely rare. In 1994 the United States Fish and Wildlife Service reported five populations totaling 45 to 65 individuals, and listed the plant as an endangered species. As of today, the species is possibly extinct in the wild. The last single individual was recorded in the wild in 2014.

It grows on rocky ledges with little soil and steep sea cliffs. Associated plants include āhinahina (Artemisia spp.) akoko (Euphorbia celastroides), alahee (Psydrax odorata), kāwelu (Eragrostis variabilis), pili (Heteropogon contortus), kokio ula (Hibiscus kokio), ānaunau (Lepidium serra), nehe (Lipochaeta succulenta), pokulakalaka (Munroidendron racemosum), and ilima (Sida fallax).

Endangered status 
According to the U.S. Botanic Garden, its only pollinator was a certain type of now-extinct hawk moth.  This has made it all but impossible for B. insignis to reproduce on its own. Therefore, individuals only produce seed when artificially pollinated by humans.

Other threats to the species have included exotic plant species, feral goats and pigs, slugs, rats, fire, and infestations of carmine spider mites (Tetranychus cinnabarinus). There is also a hiking trail near one of the populations. The plant grows on steep, exposed cliffs and has been damaged by hurricanes and landslides.

Cultivation  
Despite its rarity in the wild it is not hard to cultivate in a nursery, and it has come into use as a novel ornamental plant.

Gallery

References

External links

insignis
Critically endangered plants
Endemic flora of Hawaii
Trees of Hawaii
Niihau
Biota of Kauai